William Scott "Jack" Elam (November 13, 1920 – October 20, 2003) was an American film and television actor best known for his numerous roles as villains in Western films and, later in his career, comedies (sometimes spoofing his villainous image). His most distinguishing physical quality was his misaligned eye.  Before his career in acting, he took several jobs in finance and served two years in the United States Navy during World War II.

Elam performed in 73 movies and in at least 41 television series.

Early life
Born in 1920 in Miami, Arizonaa small mining town located 85 miles east of PhoenixJack was one of two children of Alice Amelia (née Kerby) and Millard Elam. Jack's father supported the family by working assorted jobs over the years, including stints as a carpenter, "millman", and accountant. The Elams by 1924 had moved from Miami to the nearby community of Globe, Arizona, where in September that year Alice died at the age of 30, succumbing to what state medical records cite as a three-year struggle with "general paralysis". After their mother's death, young Jack and his older sister Mildred went to live with various family members until Millard married again in April 1928, then to Kansas native Flossie Varney. Federal census records show that two years later the children, their father, stepmother, and Flossie's own mother were residing together in Globe, where Millard had a new job as an investigator for a loan company. Flossie was employed as well at the time as a public school teacher, while Jack also contributed to the family's income by periodically working on nearby farms gleaning cotton.

Eye injury
In 1931 Elam suffered a severe injury to his left eye during an altercation with another boy, an injury that ultimately blinded him in that eye and permanently damaged the muscles surrounding it. As Jack grew older, the impaired muscles caused his eye increasingly to "drift" within its socket and not track in unison with his right eye, often giving him a cockeyed appearance. Percy Shain, a veteran film and television critic for The Boston Globe, interviewed Elam in 1974 and quoted the actor's comments about the injury: 
Zanuck's remarks about Elam's eye proved to be wise career advice, for despite any lifelong disadvantages that his "lazy eye" created for him personally, it proved to be an asset professionally, at least as a performer. His eye's distinctive appearance, combined with Elam's natural acting abilities, drew the attention of many casting directors of films and television series throughout the 1950s and 1960s.

Education, military service and jobs prior to acting
Before becoming an actor, Elam completed his high-school education, got married, attended college, worked in a variety of jobs, and, despite being blind in one eye, served two years in the United States Navy during World War II. He completed his secondary education in Arizona, graduating from Phoenix Union High School in the late 1930s and then moving to California, where he majored in "business studies" at Modesto and Santa Monica junior colleges. During that time, he was also employed in several positions before entering military service, including work as a salesman for a "house trailer agency", as an accountant for the Standard Oil Company, a bookkeeper at the Bank of America, and a manager at the Hotel Bel-Air in Los Angeles. For a few years after his discharge from the navy, Elam continued to apply his business training as an accountant for Hopalong Cassidy Productions and as an independent auditor for Samuel Goldwyn and other moguls and companies associated with the film industry. That work required Jack to spend long hours each day reading and examining in detail large quantities of financial records, a routine that put too much strain on his right eye, his "good eye". "'I only see out of one eye'", he explained in an interview published in The Baltimore Sun in 1974, "'and that eye kept going shut.'" While Elam was widely recognized in Hollywood as "a leading independent auditor in motion pictures", by 1947 he found it necessary to quit that successful occupation entirely. He added, "'I had [my right eye] operated on several times and finally the doctor said he couldn't open it any more. He told me I had to get out of the business immediately or go blind.'"

Acting career
Elam made his screen debut in 1949 in She Shoulda Said No!, an exploitation film in which a chorus girl's habitual marijuana smoking ruins her career and then drives her brother to suicide. Over the next decade as an actor, Elam continued to perform most often in gangster films and Westerns, firmly establishing himself in those genres as a reliable and memorable villain or "heavy". In fact, by the end of the 1950s various American news outlets and moviegoers were referring to him as "'the screen's most loathsome character'".

On television in the 1950s and 1960s, he made multiple guest-star appearances on many popular Western series, including The Lone Ranger, Gunsmoke, The Rifleman, Lawman, Bonanza, Cheyenne, Have Gun – Will Travel, Zorro, The Rebel, F Troop, Tales of Wells Fargo, The Texan, and Rawhide. In 1961, he played a slightly crazed bus passenger on The Twilight Zone episode "Will the Real Martian Please Stand Up?". That same year, he also portrayed the Mexican historical figure Juan Cortina in "The General Without a Cause", an episode of the anthology series Death Valley Days. In 1962, Elam appeared as Paul Henry on Lawman in the episode titled "Clootey Hutter".

Elam in 1963 received a rare opportunity to portray the good guy, appearing as a reformed gunfighter, Deputy U.S. Marshal J. D. Smith, in the ABC/Warner Bros. series The Dakotas, a Western intended as the successor of Cheyenne. The Dakotas ran for 19 episodes. He was then cast as George Taggart, "a former gunfighter who has become a U.S. marshal", in the 1963–1964 NBC/WB series Temple Houston.

In 1966 Jack Elam was cast in his first comedic role by Paramount Pictures, playing Hank in the Western film The Night of the Grizzly starring Clint Walker. The next year, for the Harold Hecht production The Way West, he was chosen for another light-hearted role, playing Preacher Weatherby and providing support to costars Robert Mitchum, Richard Widmark, and Kirk Douglas in a story about a wagon train traveling the Oregon Trail. Then, in 1968, Elam performed in the opening scenes of Sergio Leone's celebrated "spaghetti Western" Once Upon a Time in the West. In that film he portrays one of a trio of gunslingers sent to a train station to kill Charles Bronson's character. Elam in one sequence spends a good portion of his screen time simply trying to rid himself of an annoying fly, finally capturing the elusive insect inside the barrel of his pistol.

In 1969, he played another comedic role in Support Your Local Sheriff!, which was followed two years later by Support Your Local Gunfighter, both opposite James Garner.  After his performances in those two films, Elam found his villainous parts dwindling and his comic roles increasing. (Both films were also directed by Burt Kennedy, who had seen Elam's potential as a comedian and directed him a total of 15 times in features and television.) Between those two films, he also played a comically cranky old coot opposite John Wayne in Howard Hawks's Rio Lobo (1970). In 1974–1975, he was cast as Zack Wheeler in The Texas Wheelers, a short-lived comedy series in which he portrayed a long-lost father returning home to raise his four children after their mother dies. Also on television, in 1979, he performed as Frankenstein's monster on the CBS sitcom Struck by Lightning, but the show was cancelled after only three episodes (the remaining eight were unaired (and remain so) in the U.S., though all 11 were aired in the UK in 1980). He then appeared in the role of Hick Peterson in a first-season episode of Home Improvement alongside Ernest Borgnine (season one, episode 20, "Birds of a Feather Flock to Tim").

Elam portrayed Doctor Nikolas Van Helsing, a "crazed proctologist", in the 1981 action-comedy film The Cannonball Run; and three years later, he reprised the role for the production's sequel, Cannonball Run II. Elam then played the character Charlie Hankins, a town drunk, in the 1986 "Weird Western" picture The Aurora Encounter. During production, Elam developed what would become a lifelong relationship with an 11-year-old boy in Texas named Mickey Hays, who suffered from progeria. The 1987 documentary I Am Not a Freak portrays the close friendship between Elam and Hays. Elam said, "You know I've met a lot of people, but I've never met anybody that got next to me like Mickey."

In 1986, Elam also co-starred on the short-lived comedy series Easy Street as Alvin "Bully" Stevenson, the down-on-his-luck uncle of Loni Anderson's character, L. K. McGuire. In 1988, Elam co-starred with Willie Nelson in the made-for-television movie Where The Hell's That Gold?

In 1994, Elam was inducted into the Hall of Great Western Performers of the National Cowboy and Western Heritage Museum in Oklahoma City, OK.

Personal life and death
Elam was married twice, first to Jean Louise Hodgert from 1937 until her death from colon cancer on January 24, 1961. Seven months later, in August 1961, Elam married again, then to Margaret M. Jennison. The couple remained together for 42 years, until 2003, when Jack died of congestive heart failure at their home in Ashland, Oregon.

Filmography

Film

Television

Awards and recognition
 1983: The 1st Annual Golden Boot Awards
 1994: National Cowboy Hall of Fame, at the Western Heritage Center.

Notes

References

Further reading
 

 1920 United States Census, Arizona, Gila County, Miami
 1924 September 7; Arizona Original Certificate of Death for Alice Amelia Kerby Elam
 1930 United States Census, Arizona, Gila County, Miami
 2003 October 20; Oregon Certificate of Death for Jack Elam

External links
 
 
 Literature on Jack Elam

1920 births
2003 deaths
20th-century American male actors
American male film actors
American male television actors
American people with disabilities
Male Western (genre) film actors
Male actors from Arizona
People from Los Angeles
People from Miami, Arizona
Warner Bros. contract players
Western (genre) television actors
Male Spaghetti Western actors
United States Navy personnel of World War II